Capital punishment in Turkmenistan was originally allowed by Article 20 of the 1992 Constitution, where it was described as "an exceptional punishment for the heaviest of crimes". In December 1999, a presidential decree abolished capital punishment "forever".

The article 20 of the 2003 Constitution read: "The death penalty in Turkmenistan is completely abolished and banned forever by the first President of Turkmenistan Great Saparmurat Türkmenbaşy".

Turkmenistan is a member of the Second Optional Protocol to the International Covenant on Civil and Political Rights, aiming at the abolition of the death penalty. The death penalty was replaced with life imprisonment.

References

Turkmenistan
Law of Turkmenistan
Death in Turkmenistan
Human rights abuses in Turkmenistan